North Carolina's 1st House district is one of 120 districts in the North Carolina House of Representatives. It has been represented by Republican Ed Goodwin since 2019.

Geography
Since 2023, the district has included all of Washington, Chowan, Perquimans, Tyrrell, and Currituck counties, as well as part of Dare County. The district overlaps with the 1st and 3rd Senate districts.

District officeholders since 1995

Election results

2022

2020

2018

2016

2014

2012

2010

2008

2006

2004

2002

2000

References

North Carolina House districts
Washington County, North Carolina
Chowan County, North Carolina
Perquimans County, North Carolina
Tyrrell County, North Carolina
Currituck County, North Carolina
Dare County, North Carolina